Marjorie Deans (1 December 1901 – 1982) was a British screenwriter and film director. During the 1930s she worked on a number of films for British International Pictures.

Selected filmography
 The Rise of Catherine the Great (1934)
 The Great Defender (1934)
 Give Her a Ring (1934)
 Royal Cavalcade (1935)
 Drake of England (1935)
 A Star Fell from Heaven (1936)
 Living Dangerously (1936)
 Ourselves Alone (1936)
 Aren't Men Beasts! (1937)
 Kathleen Mavourneen (1938)
 Major Barbara (1941)
 Talk About Jacqueline (1942)
 Woman to Woman (1947)
 The Girl Who Couldn't Quite (1950)
 The Girl Is Mine (1950)

Bibliography
 Harper, Sue. Women in British Cinema: Mad, Bad and Dangerous to Know. Continuum International Publishing Group, 2000.

External links

1901 births
1982 deaths
Writers from London
British women screenwriters
British women film directors
20th-century English screenwriters